Route 226 is a two-lane east/west highway in Quebec, Canada. Its western terminus is at the junction of Route 132 in Pierreville and its eastern terminus is in Sainte-Croix at the junction of Route 271. 

Route 226 is an exclusively rural highway going through very small villages in the Chaudière-Appalaches and mostly in the Centre-du-Québec regions. The biggest village along the way is Saint-Édouard-de-Lotbinière, with 1,200 people.

Municipalities along Route 226

 Pierreville
 Saint-Elphège
 La-Visitation-de-Yamaska
 Sainte-Monique
 Grand-Saint-Esprit
 Saint-Célestin (municipality)
 Saint-Célestin (village)
 Bécancour
 Sainte-Marie-de-Blandford
 Sainte-Sophie-de-Lévrard
 Fortierville
 Parisville
 Leclercville
 Saint-Édouard-de-Lotbinière
 Sainte-Croix

See also
 List of Quebec provincial highways

References

External links 
 Provincial Route Map (Courtesy of the Quebec Ministry of Transportation) 
Route 226 on Google Maps

226